Georgia Revolution FC is an American soccer club based in McDonough, Georgia, United States. The team competes in the Southeast Conference of the National Premier Soccer League (NPSL), the fourth tier of the United States soccer league system.  The NPSL is officially affiliated to the United States Adult Soccer Association (USASA) and qualifies for the U.S. Open Cup.  It is generally considered to be the level of competition behind Major League Soccer (MLS), the USL Championship, USL League One, and roughly equal with USL League Two.

History
The Georgia Revolution FC was founded in 2010 to begin play in the National Premier Soccer League (NPSL), the fourth tier of the American soccer pyramid. The team was created to serve as the top level of the Rockdale Youth Soccer Association.   The Revolution defeated Jacksonville United 2–1 in its first game on May 13, 2011.

The Revolution qualified for the 2012 Lamar Hunt U.S. Open Cup, defeating PDL side Mississippi Brilla on May 15, 2012, on a header goal scored by Hailob Habtom in extra time. They moved on to the next round and faced the NASL's Atlanta Silverbacks, where they lost 1–0 thanks to a goal by Raphael Cox. Later in their season they defeated the reigning NPSL champions, Jacksonville United, 7–3 in a regular season match.

The Revolution would again qualify for the Open Cup in 2013 and see a rematch against second division state rivals, Atlanta Silverbacks, losing 3–2.

Following the 2015 regular season, the team participated in the NPSL playoffs losing to the Atlanta Silverbacks (NPSL).  At the end of 2015, the Revolution was sold by the Rockdale Youth Soccer Association to a new ownership group.

In 2016, the Revolution won the inaugural I-20 Cup by defeating the Birmingham Hammers 2–0 on aggregate in the two match tournament.

The 2016–2017 off season brought many changes to the Revs organization.  The team was moved from Conyers to McDonough in Henry County, Georgia. The move generated excitement in the local community and brought many more high quality players to the squad.  In addition, the Revs Reserves were formed to play in the Atlanta District Amateur Soccer League as a way to develop talent in the local area.

During the 2018 season, the Revs Senior Team's home matches were played at Warhawks Stadium at Henry County High School. This was the first time the team played in a stadium and also live streamed all home games. The team returned to the playoffs for only the third time and made club history by winning its first playoff game 3–2 over the New Orleans Jesters with goals by Ehjayson Henry, Jumar Oakley and Isaac Promise.

In 2019, the club won its first trophy in its history. The 2018/2019 ADASL season saw the Georgia Revolution Reserves win the division 1 championship, winning the trophy and the entry into the 2019-2020 US Open Cup qualifiers. The team competed in the 2019 NPSL summer season, where the club finished 3-1-6 and 5th in the southeast conference, just missing out on the playoffs. On September 21, the reserves team began its US open cup journey away at ATLetic FC in Sandy Springs, Georgia. The Revolution emerged victorious with a 1–0 win. The club was drawn away to Soda City FC of Columbia, South Carolina. The game was played on November 2 with Soda City prevailing 4–2.

In 2020, the NPSL summer season was cancelled due to COVID-19. The club missed out on play until July, when the club joined the NISA Independent Cup, along with Chattanooga FC, Soda City FC, and Savannah Clovers. The club finished 4th in the group, going 0-1-3.

2021 was the best season to date in club history.  The squad won the NPSL Southeast conference, finishing the regular season 8-1-1 ranked #9 in the Nation.  They went on to win both conference playoff games, defeating LSA on PKs and Georgia Storm 2-1 in the final.  In the Regional semi-final, the Revs fell on a late goal 1-2 to Motown FC in Baltimore.  The teams performance qualified them for the 2022 US Open Cup.  Rev Defender Oier Bernaola was voted the NPSL Player of the Year.

2022 saw the Revs return to the Lamar Hunt US Open Cup, losing a highly contested match to Southern States of the NPSL in Hattiesburg, MS in the first round.  The team had another strong performance in NPSL play, earning 2nd place in the Southeast Conference but fell to North Alabama SC 0-1 in the playoffs.  Defender George Maxwell earned NPSL Region XI honors and Southeast Conference XI along with teammates Sebastian Doppelhofer, Kimo Lemki, and Callum Schorah.

Colors and badge

Crest
In 2016 a new crest was introduced. Paying homage to the history of the team, the new crest keeps the familiar Eagle's Head and patriotic red, white, and blue colors. Transitioning to a circle which unites the entire crest symbolizing the team motto "United We Stand" while highlighting the name Georgia Revolution FC and the year the team was established, 2010.

Colors
The colors of the Georgia Revolution FC are Red, White, and Blue. For the first five seasons of the club's existence they wore Blue or White Jerseys with matching shorts and red/white stripped or blue/white stripped socks. For 2016, Joma was the Kit Supplier. With that came a change to a Red and White stripped home Jersey and a White away Jersey.  Both Jerseys are worn with blue shorts and either blue or white socks. In 2019, Summa Sportwear became the new Kit supplier and our away kit was changed to all blue.

Sponsorship

Club culture

Rivalries
When the Georgia Storm FC joined the NPSL in 2021, a new rivalry was born. In the first game ever between the teams, a Revs defender was issued a red card in the first 10 minutes for a hard foul against a Storm player and the rivalry began. The Revs went on to win that game 1-0 with a late goal. The two teams played to a draw in a game later that season and faced off in the Conference Championship, which the Revs won 2-1.

For several years, the Georgia Revolution FC's primary rival were the crosstown Atlanta Silverbacks. The teams first played in the 2012 US Open Cup and again in 2013. When the Silverbacks left the North American Soccer League to join the NPSL in 2016 the rivalry was rekindled but ended when the Silverbacks folded after the 2019 season.

In the past, the club had a burgeoning rivalry with the Birmingham Hammers. The two teams competed annually for the I-20 Cup, a competition instituted by the two clubs. The cup was awarded to the team that had the most points across the teams' meetings throughout the season. The Birmingham Hammers moved to the PDL in 2018.

Supporters

The major supporters' group is The Uprising.The Uprising was created on April 29, 2017. They are known to "wave flags, set off fan smoke matching our colors, beat drums and provide great support to our players and a great atmosphere to all attendees.” In addition, they have hosted public tailgates before home matches.

Affiliates

Georgia Revolution FC works with several youth soccer organizations in the Georgia Soccer community; including Lake Country United FC. Lake Country FC (formerly Putnam Impact Soccer Club) is a highly respected soccer club east of the Atlanta metro area which provides elite soccer, at what is considered by most a lower than the typical cost, in one of the most economically challenged areas of Georgia.  Georgia Revolution FC provides support to these affiliates by sharing resources and providing mentoring and access to the teams and members of the coaching staff before and after games and training sessions.

Players

First-team squad
As of May 6, 2022

Reserve squad
The GA Revs Reserves were established in 2016 and play in the Atlanta District Amateur Soccer League, Atlanta's oldest and most prestigious local league.  The season goes from October through April.  The team also participates in the Perrin Cup, an Inter-League knockout style tournament that includes teams from both Divisions and is played throughout the ADASL season.

The purpose of the Revs Reserves is to identify and develop local soccer players who have the potential of playing for the Georgia Revolution FC Senior Team which plays in the National Premier Soccer League (NPSL).  The Reserves are an extension of the club, providing players professional training from the NPSL coaching staff to improve the individual players, while maintaining the playing style and philosophy of the Senior Team.  The team includes non-college players from the NPSL Team, adding quality of play and value to player development.

2016–2017 Season.  The Revs Reserves played a strong first season in the ADASL, achieving a second-place finish in Division II and gaining promotion to Division I.  They also advance to the Perrin Cup Semi-Final, losing to defending Champions Arsenal Atlanta. Five new players were promoted from the Revs Reserves to the Senior Team and competed during the 2017 NPSL Season, providing a pathway for players to reach the next level.

2017–2018 Season.  Based on the success of the previous year, the Revs U23 Team was created to compete in DIV II of the ADASL.  After the end of the NPSL season, three new players were promoted to the Senior Squad.  Standout forward Steeve Selso Saint-Duc signed with Los Angeles FC mid-ADASL season.

2018-2019 Season.  The Revs added the Revs U21 Team to complete in DIV II of the ADASL.  The season was very successful with the Revs Reserves winning the ADASL Championship and entering the 2020 the US Open Cup Qualifiers.  Second year returner Clayton Adams signed with Austin Bold FC mid-ADASL season.

2019-2020 Season.  The season was cut short due to the COVID pandemic.  It was still a successful year for the Revs in the ADASL, seeing the Revs U23s promoted to DIV I of the ADASL.

2020-2021 Season.   The Revs Reserves won their second ADASL Champion.  The Revs U23s remained in Div I.

2021-2022 Season.  The club dropped back down to two ADASL team.  The Revs Reserves and Revs U23s both play if Div 1 of the ADASL.  The Revs Reserves made it to the 3rd round qualifiers of the Lamar Hunt US Open Cup and won the Perrin Cup.  The Revs U23s were relegated back to Div II at the end of the season.

Notable former players
 2011-2013  Kwadwo Poku – Atlanta Silverbacks (NASL), New York City FC (MLS), Miami FC (NASL), FC Anzhi Makhachkala (Russian Premier League), Tampa Bay Rowdies (USL Championship)
 2011-2013  Michael Nwiloh – Chivas USA (MLS)
 2011-2013  Mark Lavery – Atlanta Silverbacks (NASL), Knattspyrnudeild Hamars (2. deild karla) , Juventud Escazuceña (Segunda División de Costa Rica) 
 2012-2013  Aaron Walker – FC Cincinnati (USL), BÍ/Bolungarvík (1. deild karla) , Atlanta Silverbacks (NPSL), Greenville Triumph SC (USL League One)
 2015  Darvin Ebanks – Harrisburg City Islanders (USL), Harrisburg Heat (MASL)
 2016  Grace Balegamire – SpVgg EGC Wirges (Rheinlandliga) 
 2016  Nick Wells – Tormenta FC (USL League One)
 2016  Cameron Saul – Greenville Triumph SC (USL League One), Finn Harps FC (League of Ireland Premier Division)
 2016-2017 Reserves  Chinedu Arinza – Wagga City Wanderers (Football NSW) 
 2017-2018 Reserves  Steeve Selso Saint-Duc – Los Angeles FC (MLS), Lansing Ignite FC (USL League One)
 2018  Isaac Promise – Austin Bold FC (USL Championship)
 2018  Alex Harlley – Las Vegas Lights FC (USL Championship)
 2018  Clayton Adams – Austin Bold FC (USL Championship)
 2018  Ehjayson Henry - Alicante City (Segunda Regional de la Comunidad Valenciana) 
 2018-2019  Jack Gurr – Atlanta United 2 (USL Championship), Atlanta United (MLS) 
 2018-2019  Jumar Oakley – Seaford Rangers FC (South Australian State League 1) 
 2018-2019  Toni Tiente – Atlanta United 2 (USL Championship)
 2021  Ollie Peters – Bishop's Stortford F.C. (Isthmian Premier) 
 2021  Oier Bernaola – Sociedad Deportiva Zamudio (Tercera División RFEF) 
 2021  Christian Waegelin – AC Syracuse Pulse (National Independent Soccer Association)
 2021  Chris Banfi – Bodens BK (Division 2 Norrland) 
 2021  Ousman Jabang – CF Montréal (MLS)

Staff

Executive staff

Technical staff (NPSL)

Technical staff (ADASL)

Records

Team records
Year-by-Year

Year-by-Year (Rev Reserves)

Year-by-Year (Revs U23)

NOTE: 2019-2020 ADASL Season and the Perrin Cup were ended early due to the COVID-19 outbreak.

Player records
NPSL Players of the Year

All-Time Senior Team Statistical Leaders

Stadium
 RYSA Soccerplex; Conyers, Georgia (2011–2016)
 N. Mt. Carmel Soccer Park; Hampton, Georgia (2017)
 Henry County High School; McDonough, Georgia (2018–2021)
 McDonough High School; McDonough, Georgia (2022-present)

References

External links
 



Association football clubs established in 2010
National Premier Soccer League teams
2010 establishments in Georgia (U.S. state)
Soccer clubs in Georgia (U.S. state)